Francis, Dauphin of France may refer to:

 Francis III, Duke of Brittany, Dauphin of France in 1518–1536, son and heir of Francis I of France
 Francis II of France, Dauphin of France in 1544–1560, son and heir of Henry II of France
 Francis, Dauphin of France (1466), died in infancy, son and heir of Louis XI of France
 Francis, Dauphin of France (1497), died in infancy, son and heir of Charles VIII of France